Naval Air Station Pensacola Corry Station (NASP Corry Station), Information Warfare Training Command (IWTC), formerly known as Naval Technical Training Center Corry Station in Florida, United States, is a sub-installation of nearby Naval Air Station Pensacola that hosts several of the Navy's Information Warfare Corps training commands. IWTC is the headquarters for its Center for Information Warfare Training and is part of the U.S. Navy's Tenth Fleet.

History 
The original Corry Field, initially Kiwanis Field, had its beginning in 1923 in a remote area north of Pensacola, Florida, with relocation to its present site in 1928. The station honors Medal of Honor recipient LCDR William M. Corry, Jr., USN.

In its beginning, Corry Field was an active aviation training complex where advanced fighter plane techniques were taught. In 1943, the field was re-designated as Naval Auxiliary Air Station Corry Field, continuing to serve as a training center for student Naval Aviators through World War II and during the Korean War and Cold War, until its decommissioning as an active airfield in June 1958.

The site saw its metamorphosis from flight training to technical training in 1960, when the first class of Navy enlisted Communications Technicians (their rating insignia indicated by a feather pen crossed by a spark; later known as Cryptologic Technicians) arrived.  During this time, the installation was known as Naval Communications Training Center Corry Field. Hangars were converted into classrooms and laboratories that were stocked with communications training equipment.  To reflect this change, the Chief of Naval Operations changed the name of Corry Field to Naval Technical Training Center Corry Station 

In 1973.  NTTC Corry Station was among the first Navy technical schools to be accredited by the Southern Association of Colleges and Schools and this accreditation certified that the instruction offered at NTTC and students could receive college-level credit for completed courses. 

In 2003, Naval Technical Training Center Corry Station officially became the Center for Cryptology Corry Station, as part of the Chief of Naval Operations establishment of Navy Learning Centers in support of the Revolution in Training. 

In 2005, Center for Cryptology Corry Station and the Center for Information Technology San Diego merged to become the Center for Information Dominance Corry Station.

In 2016, the Center for Information Dominance Corry Station name was changed to Information Warfare Training Command (IWTC) by Vice admiral Ted N. "Twig" Branch, who was at the time, "Deputy Chief of Naval Operations for Information Warfare and Director of Naval Intelligence".

Tenant Commands 
Majority of the tenants on NASP Corry Station are somehow involved with the Information Warfare community. Outside of the CIWT HQ, the following commands are located on the installation (as of Feb 2017):
 Marine Detachment Corry Station
 Center for Naval Leadership Detachment Corry Station
 Army 344th Military Intelligence Battalion (Company D)
 Navy Information Operations Command Pensacola

References

Military installations in Florida
Training installations of the United States Navy
1928 establishments in Florida
Military installations established in 1928